Brevundimonas denitrificans is a Gram-negative, aerobic, heterotrophic and denitrifying bacterium from the genus of Brevundimonas which has been isolated from deep seafloor sediments from Japan.

References

Bacteria described in 2014
Caulobacterales